William John Petrick III (born April 29, 1984) is an American  Major League Baseball pitcher who is currently playing for Carson’s tap slow pitch softball team in Ransom, Illinois.

Petrick made his major league debut on June 27,  for the Chicago Cubs, against the Colorado Rockies giving up two earned runs in two innings.

On February 13, 2009, Petrick signed with the Windy City ThunderBolts for their 2009 season. Petrick appeared in 11 games on the season while recovering from an injury. He went 1-0 with a 2.13 ERA in 12.2 innings, racking up three saves and 15 strikeouts while walking only three.

On April 21, 2010, the Joliet JackHammers acquired Petrick, from the ThunderBolts.

Petrick signed with the Amarillo Thunderheads of the American Association of Independent Professional Baseball for the 2015 season.

Petrick's brother, Zach, is also a professional baseball player.

References

External links
Baseball America

 Joliet Jackhammers April 21, 2010 press release.

1984 births
Living people
Major League Baseball pitchers
Chicago Cubs players
Baseball players from Chicago
Sportspeople from Kankakee, Illinois
People from Grundy County, Illinois
Joliet Slammers players
Joliet JackHammers players
Edinburg Roadrunners players
Windy City ThunderBolts players
Abilene Prairie Dogs players
Amarillo Thunderheads players